P. N. Patil - Sadolikar is a leader of Indian National Congress
and a member of the Maharashtra Legislative Assembly elected from
Karvir Assembly constituency in Kolhapur city.

Positions held
 2019: Elected to Maharashtra Legislative Assembly.

References

1953 births
Living people
Members of the Maharashtra Legislative Assembly
Indian National Congress politicians from Maharashtra
People from Kolhapur